Derek Mallow (born June 12, 1989) is an American politician from Georgia. Mallow is a Democrat member of the Georgia State Senate for the 2nd District. Prior to becoming a State Senator, Mallow was a member of the Georgia House of Representatives for the 163rd District.

References

African-American state legislators in Georgia (U.S. state)
Democratic Party members of the Georgia House of Representatives
21st-century American politicians
Living people
21st-century African-American politicians
1989 births